Kim Edwin Williams (June 28, 1947 – February 11, 2015) was an American songwriter who wrote hits for Randy Travis, Joe Diffie, Reba McEntire, Garth Brooks and many others. Williams was named ASCAP's Country Songwriter of the Year in 1994, won the Country Music Association's Song of the Year award (for "Three Wooden Crosses") in 2003, and was inducted into the Nashville Songwriters Hall of Fame in 2012.

Songs written by Kim Williams

References

External links

Kim Williams at the Nashville Songwriters Hall of Fame

1947 births
2016 deaths
American male songwriters
American country songwriters
Music of East Tennessee
People from Kingsport, Tennessee
Songwriters from Tennessee